is a Japanese sports shooter. She competed in the women's 10 metre air pistol event at the 2016 Summer Olympics.

References

External links
 
 

1984 births
Living people
Japanese female sport shooters
Olympic shooters of Japan
Shooters at the 2016 Summer Olympics
Place of birth missing (living people)
Shooters at the 2018 Asian Games
Asian Games competitors for Japan
21st-century Japanese women